Miangaskar (also Romanized as Mīāngaskar and Meyān Gaskar) is a village in Ziabar Rural District, in the Central District of Sowme'eh Sara County, Gilan Province, Iran. At the 2006 census, its population was 331, in 94 families.

References 

Populated places in Sowme'eh Sara County